Andrianam is a monotypic moth genus of the family Noctuidae. Its only species, Andrianam poinimerina, is known from Madagascar. Both the genus and species were first described by Pierre Viette in 1954.

References

Catocalinae
Noctuoidea genera
Monotypic moth genera